Robert Jack Blanton (born September 7, 1989) is a former American football strong safety. He played college football at the University of Notre Dame and was drafted by the Minnesota Vikings in the fifth round of the 2012 NFL Draft.

Early years
Born in Clackamas Oregon, Blanton attended David W. Butler High School in Matthews, NC. He was named second-team All-state as a sophomore after recording 126 tackles, six interceptions, 10 pass breakups, causing six fumbles and blocking six kicks. He was one of 11 players from the state of North Carolina selected to the All-Southern team by The Orlando Sentinel. He was named to the Super Southern 100 list by The Atlanta Journal-Constitution as one of 10 cornerbacks. As a junior, he totaled 147 tackles, 12 pass breakups and seven interceptions in 15 games played. He also caught four passes for 86 yards. He was named first-team All-state in 2006 and 2007 by the Associated Press. As senior in 2007, he tallied 94 tackles, five interceptions and blocked six kicks, helping the Bulldogs reach the second round of Class 4AA playoffs and earning Defensive Player of the Year honors by The Charlotte Observer. He was one of five finalists for the Glenn Davis Award, a national award based on community service, academics and athletic accomplishment. He was selected for the 2008 U.S. Army All-American Bowl in San Antonio, Texas, where he played both cornerback and safety. He also played in the Shrine Bowl of the Carolinas.

Blanton also participated in basketball and track & field at Butler. He ran hurdles and was a jumper, surpassing 6.40 meters (21 feet) in the long jump and clearing 2.01 meters (6 feet, 7 inches) in the high jump. As a senior in 2008, he recorded a personal-best time of 7.62 seconds in the 55m hurdles. At the NCHSAA 4A State Meet, he placed 4th in the 110m hurdles with a time of 14.47 seconds and 7th in the 300m hurdles with a time of 38.73 seconds.

Considered a four-star recruit by Rivals.com, Blanton was rated as the top cover safety in nation, the 22nd best safety in the country and the seventh-best prospect in the state of North Carolina. He was also rated as the 15th-best cornerback in the country and the third-best player in his state by Scout.com.

College career
Blanton attended the University of Notre Dame between 2008 and 2011. Playing in 50 games, 26 in which he started, he amassed a total of 194 tackles, including 19.5 for loss, 2.5 sacks, 23 pass deflections, and eight interceptions, returning one for a touchdown.

Professional career

Minnesota Vikings
Blanton was drafted by the Minnesota Vikings with the fourth pick of the 5th round (139th overall) of the 2012 NFL Draft. On May 22, 2012, Blanton signed with the Vikings.

In 2014, Blanton had the best season of his career, leading the team in tackles with 106, while also forcing one fumble and intercepting one pass, as well as recording 3 pass deflections.

In 2015, Blanton looked to compete with Antone Exum and Andrew Sendejo for the starting job at strong safety.

Buffalo Bills
On March 18, 2016, Blanton signed a one-year contract with the Buffalo Bills worth $840,000 with $80,000 guaranteed. He suffered a foot injury in Week 11 and was placed on injured reserve on November 26, 2016.

Dallas Cowboys
On April 20, 2017, Blanton signed with the Dallas Cowboys. He was released on September 2, 2017.

Buffalo Bills (second stint)
On September 20, 2017, Blanton signed with the Bills. He was released on October 3, 2017.

Personal life
At Butler, Blanton was recognized as Carolina Panthers Community Captain for his outstanding performance in classroom and in community. He was a member of Butler honor roll and a first lieutenant in Butler's JROTC program, receiving an JROTC Scholastic Award. He served as a coach for an 11-12-year-old football team at Youth Football Club of Mint Hill. He was spokesperson for Butler High's D.R.E.A.M. Team (Daring to Role-model Excellence as Athletic Mentors) and was one of only 12 hand-selected members.

References

External links
 
 Minnesota Vikings bio 
 Notre Dame Fighting Irish bio

1989 births
Living people
American football cornerbacks
American football safeties
Buffalo Bills players
Dallas Cowboys players
Minnesota Vikings players
Notre Dame Fighting Irish football players
People from Clackamas, Oregon
Players of American football from Oregon
Sportspeople from the Portland metropolitan area